Saint Kitts Creole is a dialect of Leeward Caribbean Creole English spoken in Saint Kitts and Nevis by around 40,000 people. Saint Kitts Creole does not have the status of an official language.

Saint Kitts Creole has much the same history as other English Caribbean creoles. Its origin lies in 17th-century enslaved West Africans, who, when brought to the islands to work on sugar plantations, were forced to learn British English quickly because their labour required it. Their English was mixed with West African words and, in some cases, West African language structure. The French, who occupied the island from 1625 to 1713, had only a small impact on the creole spoken today, unlike in the formerly French islands of Dominica and Saint Lucia, which speak a French-based rather than English-based creole.

Saint Kitts Creole today is spoken on the islands of St. Kitts and Nevis (although Nevisians refer to the language as "Nevisian" or "Nevis creole"), mainly in rural areas, and is spoken especially heavily in Capesterre, i.e. the east coast of St. Kitts (Christ Church Nichola Town, Cayon), and Nevis. Today's use of the creole involves a higher proportion of Standard English, possibly due to access to foreign media. Usually, only residents in rural areas are strong creole users, although mesolectal forms of the language are employed by the majority of the population. Popular Jamaican culture and music have also played a role, as Jamaican idioms are being used more and more in the Saint Kitts creole, as well as throughout the region.

Saint Kitts pronunciation is similar to the pronunciation on the neighbouring islands of Antigua and Montserrat, but with slight differences that are mostly noticeable only to residents of the Leeward Islands.

Pronunciation
Saint Kitts Creole is pronounced similarly to the creoles of neighbouring islands, namely Antigua and Montserrat. Usually only longtime residents in the islands can mark the slight differences. In rural areas and in Nevis,  (as in "house") is usually pronounced  (as in "hose").

Grammar
In Saint Kitts Creole, words are rarely pluralized by adding an ending to the word. The word is usually followed by the word dem to indicate the pluralization. e.g.  - "the girls". Note that if the Standard English form of the word is not pluralized with an "s", e.g. "children", the plural form of the word in Saint Kitts creole will be the Standard English plural form followed by dem, e.g. .

Questions ending in "is it?" have the "is it" replaced with e be (eee bee); e.g. Who is it? - Who e be? What is it? - Wha e be?

Words used to intensify adjectives, such as "very" and "extremely", are rarely used. Instead, the adjective in question is repeated; for example: De gyul look bad bad - "The girl looks very ugly." Alternatively, the phrase "so tail" is placed after the adjective to indicate a strong emphasis or intensification; for example: De gyul look bad so tail - "The girl looks extremely ugly."

A unique aspect of Saint Kitts Creole is to end certain sentences in the speech with the words burdee, poopa or daady buh, the meaning of which vary with context but tend to be used to emphasise the sentence they attach to; for example: Tall poopa - "not at all" (extreme). Hush buhdee - "hush buddy" (used when extremely annoyed).

The word "does" is often traditionally inserted where it would not appear in Standard English sentence structure.

I does only buy taman jam from she. I only buy tamarind jam from her.

Whey yuh does be goin erry mawnin? Where do you go each morning?

I does do dah too. I also do that.

Yuh does guh by dey house? Do you visit their home?

Examples of other linguistic divergences from Standard English are

Ah does buy it. I usually buy it.

Ah did buy it. I bought it.

Ah done buy it. I already bought it. Also can be said as - Ah did buy it arready.

Ah goin buy it. I will buy it.

Ah goin guh buy it. I am on my way to buy it.

Example sentences
Ahwee/Awe a go dung by e fiel by d house go pik nuts. - We are going down to the field by the house to pick peanuts.

Is dey dem pikni does wash dem skin. - There is where the children bathe (their skin).

Unno kno who e tis u a play wit u kno. - You do not know with whom you are messing.

Example words and phrases
Some of the Saint Kitts Creole words listed below are unique, but others are commonly used in or originated from neighbouring islands.

Coop = spying surreptitiously on someone to try and catch them in some inappropriate act, or to surprise them.  
Baae = A Boo or jeer (also used to describe the action of sticking one's tongue out at another person)   
Bony/Mawga = Skinny, malnourished   
Dear = expensive 
Duttyfoot/slack/pan/kite = a slut  
Fohwud = (Forward) insolent, rude 
Guh bag yuh face = (Go and bag your face) You are so repulsive that you should cover your face. 
Guh whey yuh goin = get away from me (with the connotation that the person being dismissed wants to go and do their own thing despite the speakers feelings.) 
Howdie = Old time way of saying hello 
Jelly = young coconut; the flesh inside of a young coconut which has a jelly-like consistency  
Jelly water = coconut water
Jumbie = an undead spirit/ghost.
Jumbie fyah = a fire that goes down and rises up again due to "jumbie" spirits.
Jumbie press = the instance in which someone feels that they cannot move while in bed.
Mi arm, Mi Mudders, Mi Fadder = oh my!  
Mind = take care of e.g. Mind the baby; take heed e.g. Mind what you're doing.  
Moomoo = stupid; a stupid person  
Moosheh = a very light skinned person. Originally used to describe Portuguese descendants who populated a village, located in the hills above western Sandy Point 
Outta place/outta awduh = rude with the connotation of indiscretion and acting inappropriately.  
Pissytail lil boy/girl = a young person, especially one who tries to act older than their age or disrespects those who are older than they are.  
Poop = pass gas
Quelbeh = ungodly music  
Ride/riding = sexual intercourse  
Scraab = scratch 
She fass = She is a busybody 
Um/dem = them  
Wha mek = why , how come
Who yuh fah\who yuh people be? = what family do you come from?  
Win = painful gas trapped inside the stomach or other body parts
Wukkup = gyrating dance
Yampi = mucus in the eye, from Igbo ẹnyampi, 'blind'.
Yuh gaah head = take heed

More commonly used words

 O me monkeys! = O My!
 Ah geed = Yuck!
 Boy aye! = Aw man!
 Ent it? = Isn't that so
 Wha mek? = How come
 M'ain know = I don't know
 Lef me = Leave me alone
 Tek een = Faint/pass out
 Ar-you/Awu = You all
 Arwee/Awe/Arbee =Us
 Stop play = Stop kidding around
 Y'ain hear = I know right
 E suit you = Serves you right
 In deh, in deh! = Take that
 Dem = Them
 Dey = They

Traditional proverbs
 - If you extend your charity to undeserving persons, they will be ungrateful/you will regret it.

 - When you are older you will understand.

 - you can't have two persons in charge in a small environment.

 - People know who they can trouble/mess with.

See also
Krio language

References

Languages of Saint Kitts and Nevis
English-based pidgins and creoles
Languages of the African diaspora
Creoles of the Caribbean
English language in the Caribbean